The 1970 Penn State Nittany Lions football team represented the Pennsylvania State University in the 1970 NCAA University Division football season. The team was led by fifth-year head coach Joe Paterno and played its home games in Beaver Stadium in University Park, Pennsylvania.

The Nittany Lions entered the season with a 22-game winning streak, unbeaten (29–0–1) in their last thirty games. By mid-season, they had dropped three (including one at home), then won the last five to finish at 7–3 and climbed to No. 18 in the final AP poll.

Schedule

Roster
Notable players included senior linebacker Jack Ham and junior running backs Lydell Mitchell and Franco Harris.

Post season
After three consecutive bowl appearances, Penn State stayed home this year, but went to a bowl in each of the next thirteen seasons.

NFL Draft
Four Nittany Lions were selected in the 1971 NFL Draft.

References

Penn State
Penn State Nittany Lions football seasons
Penn State Nittany Lions football